Richardson Hill is an ice-free hill in Antarctica, rising above the ice of Island Arena on the north side of the Darwin Mountains. It was mapped by the Victoria University of Wellington Antarctic Expedition (VUWAE) (1962–63) and named for Professor L.R. Richardson of the Victoria University of Wellington, New Zealand, an active supporter of the university's Antarctic expeditions.
 

Hills of Oates Land